Lebia bivittata is a species of beetle in the family Carabidae. It is found in Mexico and the United States.

References

Further reading

External links

 

Lebia
Beetles described in 1798
Taxa named by Johan Christian Fabricius